Mount Goodall is a mountain in east-central British Columbia, Canada, located near the headwaters of the Clearwater River.

The first ascent of Mount Goodall was on August 26, 2006 by Roger Wallis, Don Chiasson, and Jim Lundy from the Alpine Club of Canada. They established its height, only  lower than Wells Gray Park's highest mountain which is unnamed. As of 2015, only four of Goodall's summits have been climbed. 

Mount Goodall was named in 1966 in honor of Canadian Army Trooper Walter Henry Goodall, K 76212, from Macalister (near Quesnel, British Columbia). He was serving with the Governor General's Horse Guards, RCAC, when he was killed in action on January 4, 1945, age 24. Five other neighbouring peaks were named at the same time for Canadian soldiers from the Quesnel area who were killed during World War II: Mount Pierrway, Mount Winder, Mount Beaman, Mount Hogg, and Mount Aves.

References

External links

Wells Gray Provincial Park official government website

Two-thousanders of British Columbia
Wells Gray-Clearwater
Cariboo Mountains
Kamloops Division Yale Land District